Oxwick is a hamlet in the English county of Norfolk.  It lies close to the source of the River Wensum and lies one mile south of the village of Colkirk .

The hamlets name means 'Ox specialised farm'.

References 
http://kepn.nottingham.ac.uk/map/place/Norfolk/Oxwick%20and%20Pattesley

Hamlets in Norfolk
Breckland District